Norsalsolinol is a chemical compound that is produced naturally in the body through metabolism of dopamine. It has been shown to be a selective dopaminergic neurotoxin, and has been suggested as a possible cause of neurodegenerative conditions such as Parkinson's disease and the brain damage associated with alcoholism, although evidence for a causal relationship is unclear.

(R)-Salsolinol which has been shown to be a product of ethanol metabolism, stereospecifically induces behavioral sensitization and leads to excessive alcohol intake in rats

See also 
 6-Hydroxydopamine
 MPTP
 Rotenone

References 

Tetrahydroisoquinolines
Catechols